Black Head may refer to:

 Black head, a blocked sweat/sebaceous duct of the skin

Headlands

Antarctica
 Black Head (Graham Land)
 Black Head (South Georgia)

Australia
 Black Head, New South Wales

Republic of Ireland
 Black Head, County Clare, near Gleninagh

United Kingdom
 Black Head (The Lizard), Cornwall, part of the Kennack to Coverack Site of Special Scientific Interest
 Black Head (St Austell), Cornwall
 Black Head, County Antrim, the site of Blackhead Lighthouse

 Black Head, Dorset
 Black Head, Wigtownshire, the site of many shipwrecks including a shipwreck in 1857

United States
 Black Head (South Georgia), a promontory

See also
 Blackhead (disambiguation)